Man of Straw is the second studio album by the American thrash metal band Viking. It was released on August 8, 1989 through Metal Blade/Caroline Records, and was the band's last album before their 21-year breakup from 1990 to 2011. Man of Straw was produced by Viking's lead singer and guitarist Ron Eriksen, and like their previous album Do or Die, it was executive produced by Metal Blade founder Brian Slagel.

Track listing

Bonus track

Personnel
 Ron Eriksen - Vocals, Guitar
 Brett Eriksen - Guitar
 James Lareau - Bass
 Matt Jordan - Drums

References

1989 albums
Caroline Records albums
Metal Blade Records albums
Viking (band) albums